Enarmoniodes is a genus of moths belonging to the subfamily Olethreutinae of the family Tortricidae.

Species
Enarmoniodes furcula Kuznetzov, 1973
Enarmoniodes mirabilis Ghesquire, 1940
Enarmoniodes praetextana (Walsingham, 1897)

See also
List of Tortricidae genera

References

External links
Tortricid.net

Enarmoniini
Tortricidae genera